Pashley is a surname, and may refer to:

Anne Pashley (1935–2016), British sprinter and opera singer
Cecil Pashley (1891–1969), British aviator
David Pashley (born 1972), English cricketer
Jacqueline Pashley (born 1979), Dutch cricketer
John Pashley (1933–2015), Australian rugby union player
Robert Pashley (1805–1859), English traveler and economist
Terry Pashley (born 1956), English footballer

See also
Pashley Cycles, British bicycle manufacturer
Pashley Manor, historic house in East Sussex, England